Yang Shixian (January 8, 1897 – February 19, 1985) was a Chinese chemist. He was a member of the Chinese Academy of Sciences.

References 

1897 births
1985 deaths
Members of the Chinese Academy of Sciences